PickupPal Online Incorporated was a free online ridesharing service, that allowed its members to coordinate carpooling and ridesharing activities around the world.

History
PickupPal was founded in 2007 by John Stewart and Eric Dewhirst in Ontario, Canada.  The idea was to create an online community that would leverage social networking tools in an effort to assist drivers and passengers to find each other online.  The website was launched on January 15, 2008.  PickupPal's competitors included Zimride and GoLoco.org.

Legal challenges
In July 2008 Trentway-Wagar, a regional bus company requested that the Ontario Highway Transportation Board (OHTB) order PickupPal to cease providing service within Ontario.  PickupPal launched an online petition to lobby the Ontario Provincial Government to have the definition of a carpool vehicle amended to all carpool vehicles to cross municipal boundaries and that the restriction that all travel be limited to home and work exclusively.  On October 15. 2008 PickupPal and Trentway-Wagar defended their positions before the OHTB and subsequently on November 6, 2008 the OHTB found in favor of Trentway-Wagar.  On October 28, 2008 the Minister of Transportation tabled an amendment to the definition of a carpool vehicle that would allow operations like PickupPal to continue to operate in the province.

In 2009, the Ontario government voted in favour of Bill 118 which amended the Public Vehicle Act to not include carpool vehicles.

See also

 Trentway-Wagar

References

External links
 PickupPal Website
 Toronto Star background article 
 Save PickupPal in Ontario Website
 National Post coverage of OHTB hearing
 Techcrunch coverage of OHTB ruling

Transport in the Greater Toronto Area
Transport in Ottawa